Vsevolod or Wsewolod is a Slavic male first name.  Its etymology is from Slavic roots 'vse' (all) and 'volodeti' (to rule) and means 'lord-of-everything/everybody', (similar to another princely name, "Vladimir" or "Volodymyr"). It is equivalent to the Belarusian Usievalad, Polish Wszewład, Lithuanian Visvaldas, Latvian Visvaldis and German Wissewald. The corresponding Russian patronymic is Vsevolodovich.

Vsevolod may refer to:

Medieval princes
  (c. 983–1013), Prince of Volyn', son of Vladimir I of Kiev
 Vsevolod I of Kiev (Yaroslavich) (1030–1093), Grand Prince of Kievan Rus'
 Vsevolod Mstislavich (disambiguation)
 Vsevolod II of Kiev (Olegovich) (d. 1146), Grand Prince of Kievan Rus'
 Vsevolod III Yuryevich aka Vsevolod the Big Nest (1154–1212), Prince of Vladimir
 Vsevolod IV of Kiev (Svyatoslavich the Red) (d. 1215), twice Grand Prince of Kievan Rus' and Prince of Chernigov
 Visvaldis of Gerzike (died 1239), prince of Gerzike, later vassal of the Bishop of Riga

Other persons
 Vsevolod Luknitsky (1844–1917), Russian general-lieutenant
 Vsevolod Krestovsky (1840–1895), Russian playwright and nationalist
 Vsevolod Miller (1848–1913), Russian anthropologist and linguist
 Vsevolod Solovyov (1849–1903), Russian historical novelist
 Vsevolod Meyerhold (1874–1940), Russian and Soviet theater director
 Vsevolod Kukushkin (born 1942), Soviet Russian journalist, writer and ice hockey administrator
 Vsevolod Abramovich, (1890–1913), Russian aviator
 Vsevolod Balitsky (1892–1937), Far Eastern NKVD chief.
 Vsevolod Vishnevsky (1900–1951), Soviet dramatist and prose writer
 Vsevolod Starosselsky (1875–1935), Russian military officer
 Vsevolod Garshin (1855–1888), Russian author of short stories
 Vsevolod Sharonov (1901–1964), Russian and Soviet astronomer
 Vsevolod Aksyonov (1902–1960), Soviet film actor
 Vsevolod Rauzer (1908–1941), Soviet chess champion
 Vsevolod Tarasevich (1919–1998), Soviet photographer
 Vsevolod Blinkov (1918–1987), Soviet football player
 Vsevolod Pudovkin (1893–1953), Russian and Soviet film director, screenwriter, and actor
 Vsevolod Ivanov (1895–1963), Soviet novelist known for his stories set in the Russian Civil War
 Vsevolod Bobrov (1922–1979), Soviet athlete
 Vsevolod Safonov (1923–1992), Soviet film actor
 Vsevolod Murakhovsky (1926–2017), Soviet politician
 Vsevolod Nestayko (1930–2014), Ukrainian children's writer
 Vsevolod Shilovsky (born 1938), Soviet and Russian film actor
 Vsevolod Gakkel' (born 1953), Russian rock musician

Other uses
Vsevolod (1769; 74 guns) – Baltic Navy ship of the line burnt 1779
Vsevolod (1796; 74 guns) – Baltic Navy ship of the line destroyed in the action near Baltiyskiy Port during the Anglo-Russian War (1807–1812)
Vsevolod (1809; 66 guns) – Baltic Navy ship of the line hulked 1820

See also
 Slavic names

Russian masculine given names
Ukrainian masculine given names
Slavic masculine given names
Masculine given names